Leptopoma is a genus of land snails with a gill and an operculum, terrestrial gastropod mollusks in the family Cyclophoridae.

Species 
Species within the genus Leptopoma include:

 Leptopoma abbasi Thach, 2017
 Leptopoma achatinum Crosse, 1865
 Leptopoma acuminatum (G. B. Sowerby I, 1843)
 Leptopoma altum Möllendorff, 1897
 Leptopoma amaliae Kobelt, 1886
 Leptopoma annamiticum Möllendorff, 1900
 Leptopoma antonii Kobelt, 1886
 Leptopoma apicale Tapparone Canefri, 1883
 Leptopoma apicatum Benson, 1856
 Leptopoma approximans Kobelt, 1886
 Leptopoma aspirans Benson, 1856
 Leptopoma atricapillum (G. B. Sowerby I, 1843)
 Leptopoma aureum  Quadras &  Möllendorff, 1896
 Leptopoma bicolor (L. Pfeiffer, 1854)
 Leptopoma bipartitum Kobelt, 1886
 Leptopoma bodjoense E. A. Smith, 1888
 Leptopoma boettgeri (Möllendorff, 1887)
 Leptopoma boholense Kobelt, 1886
 Leptopoma bourguignati  Issel, 1874
 Leptopoma caroli  Dohrn, 1862
 Leptopoma celebesianum  Möllendorff, 1896
 Leptopoma concinnum (G. B. Sowerby I, 1841)
 Leptopoma condorianumCrosse & Fischer, 1863
 Leptopoma crenilabre Strubell, 1892
 † Leptopoma cretaceum Hrubesch, 1965 
 Leptopoma cuticulare Möllendorff, 1888
 Leptopoma decipiens L. Pfeiffer, 1861
 Leptopoma diplochilus Sykes, 1903
 Leptopoma dohrni A. Adams & Angas, 1864
 Leptopoma dubium Kobelt, 1886
 Leptopoma duplicatum (L. Pfeiffer, 1857)
 Leptopoma elatum (L. Pfeiffer, 1852)
 Leptopoma euconus Möllendorff, 1894
 Leptopoma fibula (G. B. Sowerby I, 1843)
 Leptopoma fibulinum Quadras &  Möllendorff, 1897
 Leptopoma freeri Bartsch, 1909
 Leptopoma fulgurans Dautzenberg, 1902
 Leptopoma fultoni Aldrich, 1898
 Leptopoma gebiense Fulton, 1904
 Leptopoma geotrochiforme E. A. Smith, 1895
 Leptopoma gianelli Tapparone Canefri, 1886
 Leptopoma globulosum L. Pfeiffer, 1861
 Leptopoma goniostoma (Reeve, 1842)
 Leptopoma halmahericum Strubell, 1892
 Leptopoma hanleyanum (L. Pfeiffer, 1856)
 Leptopoma hargravesi Cox, 1873
 Leptopoma helicoides (Grateloup, 1840)
 Leptopoma holosericum P. Sarasin & F. Sarasin, 1899
 Leptopoma huberi (Thach, 2018)
 Leptopoma ignescens (L. Pfeiffer, 1851)
 Leptopoma injectum Iredale, 1941
 Leptopoma insigne (G. B. Sowerby I, 1843)
 Leptopoma intermedium E. von Martens, 1867
 Leptopoma intuszonatum Hidalgo, 1888
 Leptopoma kuekenthali Kobelt, 1897
 Leptopoma lamellatum Sykes, 1903
 Leptopoma latelimbatum (L. Pfeiffer, 1851)
 Leptopoma latilabre E. von Martens, 1867
 Leptopoma leucorhaphe E. von Martens, 1863
 Leptopoma luteostoma (G. B. Sowerby I, 1843)
 Leptopoma maculatum (I. Lea, 1838)
 Leptopoma marginellus (Gmelin, 1791)
 Leptopoma massena (Lesson, 1831)
 Leptopoma mathildae  Dohrn, 1862
 Leptopoma maubanense Kobelt, 1886
 Leptopoma mcgregori Bartsch, 1930
 Leptopoma megalostoma Möllendorff, 1902
 Leptopoma mekongiensis Rochebrune, 1882
 Leptopoma melanostoma (Petit, 1841)
 Leptopoma melanostoma janetabbasae Thach, 2018 
 Leptopoma menadense L. Pfeiffer, 1861
 Leptopoma minus Martens, 1867
 † Leptopoma minutum Hrubesch, 1965 
 Leptopoma mitchellae E. A. Smith, 1900
 † Leptopoma morleti Cossmann, 1892 
 Leptopoma mouhoti L. Pfeiffer, 1861
 Leptopoma moussoni E. von Martens, 1865
 Leptopoma moutonense Leschke, 1914
 Leptopoma natunense E. A. Smith, 1894
 Leptopoma niasense Fulton, 1907
 Leptopoma nigrilabrum Tapparone Canefri, 1886
 Leptopoma panayense (G. B. Sowerby I, 1843)
 Leptopoma papuanum  Dohrn, 1862
 Leptopoma pellucidum (Hombron & Jacquinot, 1848)
 Leptopoma perlucidum (Grateloup, 1840)
 Leptopoma perplexum (G. B. Sowerby I, 1843)
 Leptopoma pfeifferi  Dohrn, 1862
 Leptopoma pileolus Quadras & Möllendorff, 1895
 Leptopoma pileus (G. B. Sowerby I, 1843)
 Leptopoma poecilum  Quadras & Möllendorff, 1895
 Leptopoma polillanum Möllendorff, 1894
 Leptopoma polyzonatum Möllendorff, 1882
 Leptopoma pulchellum Quadras & Möllendorff, 1894
 Leptopoma pulicarium L. Pfeiffer, 1861
 Leptopoma pumilum Tapparone Canefri, 1886
 Leptopoma puniceum Tapparone Canefri, 1886
 Leptopoma pusillum Möllendorff, 1890
 Leptopoma pyramis Kobelt, 1886
 Leptopoma quadrasi Möllendorff, 1893
 Leptopoma regulare (L. Pfeiffer, 1851)
 Leptopoma roepstorffianum G. Nevill, 1878
 Leptopoma roseum Möllendorff, 1888
 Leptopoma sarasinorum Kobelt, 1897
 Leptopoma scabrum Möllendorff, 1902
 Leptopoma scalare H. Adams, 1865
 Leptopoma sechellarum (L. Pfeiffer, 1855)
 Leptopoma semiclausum (L. Pfeiffer, 1855)
 Leptopoma sericatum (L. Pfeiffer, 1853)
 Leptopoma signatum (L. Pfeiffer, 1857)
 Leptopoma skertchlyi E. A. Smith, 1895
 Leptopoma sriabbasae Thach, 2020
 Leptopoma stainforthi (G.B. Sowerby II, 1842)
 Leptopoma subalatum Quadras & Möllendorff, 1893
 Leptopoma superbum Dohrn, 1889
 Leptopoma tagolandense Pilsbry, 1908
 Leptopoma tayninense Heude, 1890
 Leptopoma thachi F. Huber, 2020
 Leptopoma tigris Lee & Wu, 2001
 Leptopoma tissotianum (Crosse, 1878)
 Leptopoma trochus  Dohrn, 1862
 Leptopoma undatum (Metcalfe, 1851)
 Leptopoma varians Möllendorff, 1895
 Leptopoma venustulum Tapparone Canefri, 1886
 Leptopoma vexillum P. Sarasin & F. Sarasin, 1899
 Leptopoma wallacei (L. Pfeiffer, 1857)
 Leptopoma whiteheadi E. A. Smith, 1887
 Leptopoma woodfordi G. B. Sowerby III, 1890

Species brought into synonymy 
 Leptopoma nitidum (Sowerby, G.B. II, 1843) : synonym of Leptopoma perlucida (Grateloup, 1840) (junior synonym)
 Leptopoma vitreum (Lesson, 1826): synonym of Leptopoma perlucidum (Grateloup, 1840)

References

 Nomenclator Zoologicus info
 Nguyen Ngoc Thach, Leptopoma melanostoma janetabbasae, a new subspecies (Gastropoda: Cyclophoridae) from Indonesia, and Correction of Errata in “New Shells of South Asia”, The Festivus vol. 50 (4), November 2018

External links
 Pfeiffer, L. (1847). Ueber die Eintheilung der Cyclostomaceen. Zeitschrift für Malakozoologie. 4: 45–48
 Crosse H. (1878). Diagnoses generis novi Pneumonopomorum et Volutae novae. Journal de Conchyliologie. 26(2): 163–166.
 Adams, H. & Adams, A. (1853-1858). The genera of Recent Mollusca; arranged according to their organization. London, van Voorst. Vol. 1: xl + 484 pp.; vol. 2: 661 pp.; vol. 3: 138 pls.
 Herrmannsen, A. N. (1846–1852). Indicis Generum Malacozoorum primordia. Fischer, Cassel.

Cyclophoridae
Gastropod genera
Taxa named by Ludwig Karl Georg Pfeiffer